María del Mar Vega Sisto (born 14 August 1983), known professionally as Marimar Vega, is a Mexican actress. She studied acting in  Centro de Formacion Actoral of TV Azteca.

Biography
Vega was born 14 August 1983, in Mexico City, Distrito Federal, Mexico. She is the daughter of Mexican actor Gonzalo Vega and Leonora Sisto who is of Spanish descent. Vega has a sister who is also an actress Zuria Vega and a brother Gonzalo. Vega also has a half-sister Gabriela, from her father's side.

She practiced flamenco dance for twenty years and studied acting at the CEFAC, acting school of TV Azteca. She debuted in theater at age 17 with her father, actor Gonzalo Vega Don Juan Tenorio, playing the role of Doña Inés. Vega also acted on stage in the Perras. In movies, she has participated in Amor, Dolor y Viceversa and appeared as the protagonist in Daniel and Ana, a film that showed at the Cannes Film Festival where she was cast alongside Dario Yazbek and José María Torre.

Her television career started in Enamórate in 2003, her first TV Azteca telenovela, where she played Fedra. In 2007, she played Gina Montero in Mientras haya vida. In 2008 she played Karen in the series Noche Eterna.

In 2011 she played 'Elisa Mendoza del Real' in Emperatriz. In 2012 she played the protagonist in the telenovela Amor cautivo as Alejandra Santacruz Bustillos. In 2018, she played 'Valentina' (opposite Ryan Carnes and Omar Chaparro) in La Boda de Valentina, a film directed by Marco Polo Constandse.

Filmography

References

External links

1983 births
Living people
Mexican child actresses
Mexican telenovela actresses
Mexican television actresses
Mexican film actresses
Mexican stage actresses
Mexican people of Spanish descent
Actresses from Mexico City
People educated at Centro de Estudios y Formación Actoral
20th-century Mexican actresses
21st-century Mexican actresses